Nimbus proximus is a species of dung beetles in the subfamily Aphodiinae. It is found in the Palaearctic (France, Spain, and Portugal).

References

Further reading

 
 
 
 
 

Scarabaeidae
Beetles described in 1994